Sentinels of Bronze (Italian: Sentinelle di bronzo) is a 1937 Italian war film directed by Romolo Marcellini and starring Fosco Giachetti, Giovanni Grasso and Doris Duranti.

History

In the 1930s and 1940s, early Somali actors and film technicians co-operated with Italian crews to domestically produce Fascist films. Among the latter productions were Dub'aad and Sentinels of Bronze. The movie "Sentinels of Bronze" (Sentinelle di bronzo) was awarded in the Festival di Venezia of 1937 as the "Best Italian colonial Film", winning an Italian Cup.

The film is a propaganda work set in the days leading up to the outbreak of the Second Italo-Ethiopian War.

Topic

In an incident modeled on the Wal Wal incident, an Italian outpost is besieged by large numbers of Abyssinian troops, but the garrison refuse to surrender. It was part of a series of films set in Italy's African Empire during the Fascist era.

Cast
 Fosco Giachetti as Capitano Negri 
 Giovanni Grasso as Sergente Amato 
 Doris Duranti as Dahabò 
 Hassan Mohamed as Elmi 
 Mohamed Aghi Alì as Islam 
 Ali Ibrahim as Giama 
 Elmi Ahmed as Ras Sciferrà 
 Abdullah Ali as Hawariat

References

Bibliography 
 Palumbo, Patrizia. A Place in the Sun: Africa in Italian Colonial Culture from Post-unification to the Present. University of California Press, 2003.

External links 
 

1937 films
Italian war films
Italian black-and-white films
1937 war films
1930s Italian-language films
Films directed by Romolo Marcellini
Films set in 1935
Films set in Ethiopia
Italian propaganda films